Exo Planet #4 - The Elyxion [dot] (stylized as EXO PLANET #4 - The EℓyXiOn [dot]) is the third live album by South Korean–Chinese boy band Exo. It was released on January 30, 2019, by SM Entertainment and distributed by Iriver.

Track listing

Chart

Sales

See also
 Exo Planet 4 – The Elyxion

References

2019 live albums
SM Entertainment live albums
Exo albums
Korean-language albums
SM Entertainment albums